

Plants

Pteridophyta

Conifers

Angiosperms

Arthropods

Insects

Fishes

Newly named bony fishes

Amphibians

Newly named amphibians

Ichthyosaurs

Turtles

Newly named turtles

Lepidosauromorphs

Newly named basal lepidosauromorphs

Newly named plesiosaurs

Newly named sphenodonts

Archosauromorphs

Newly named basal archosauromorphs

Newly named crurotarsans

Newly named dinosaurs
Data courtesy of George Olshevsky's dinosaur genera list.

Newly named birds

Newly named pterosaurs

Synapsids

Non-mammalian

Mammalian

Footnotes

Complete author list
As science becomes more collaborative, papers with large numbers of authors are becoming more common. To prevent the deformation of the tables, these footnotes list the contributors to papers that erect new genera and have many authors.

References

 
2000s in paleontology
Paleontology